Bronx High School for Law and Community Service is a small school in the New York City borough of The Bronx.  It is located within Roosevelt Educational Campus, across the street from Fordham University.

As of the 2014–15 school year, the school had an enrollment of 416 students and 25.8 classroom teachers (on an FTE basis), for a student–teacher ratio of 16.1:1. There were 357 students (85.8% of enrollment) eligible for free lunch and 18 (4.3% of students) eligible for reduced-cost lunch.

References

External links
 Page on NYC DOE website
 Listing on insideschools.org

Public high schools in the Bronx
Belmont, Bronx